Elias Glenn (August 26, 1769 – January 6, 1846) was a United States district judge of the United States District Court for the District of Maryland.

Education and career

Born on August 26, 1769, in Elkton, Province of Maryland, British America, Glenn entered private practice in Baltimore, Maryland. He was a Judge for the Baltimore County Court. He was United States Attorney for the District of Maryland from 1812 to 1824.

Federal judicial service

Glenn received a recess appointment from President James Monroe on August 31, 1824, to a seat on the United States District Court for the District of Maryland vacated by Judge Theodorick Bland. He was nominated to the same position by President Monroe on December 16, 1824. He was confirmed by the United States Senate on January 3, 1825, and received his commission the same day. His service terminated on April 1, 1836, due to his resignation.

Later career and death

Following his resignation from the federal bench, Glenn resumed private practice in Baltimore from 1836 to 1846. He died on January 6, 1846, in Baltimore.

Family

Glenn's son, William Wilkins Glenn, was a journalist and newspaper proprietor who was jailed for his Confederate sympathies.

References

Sources
 

1769 births
1846 deaths
United States Attorneys for the District of Maryland
Judges of the United States District Court for the District of Maryland
United States federal judges appointed by James Monroe
19th-century American judges
People from Elkton, Maryland